Corner Gas is a Canadian television sitcom created by Brent Butt. The series ran for six seasons from 2004 to 2009. Re-runs still air on CTV, CTV2, CTV Comedy Channel, Much, MTV, E! and are streaming on Crave and Amazon Prime. The series was followed by a feature film titled Corner Gas: The Movie, with the entire cast reprising their roles. The film was released for a limited theatrical run in December 2014.

Brent Leroy (Brent Butt) is the proprietor of the station and Wanda Dollard (Nancy Robertson) works at the station's convenience store as a retail assistant. An adjoining coffee shop, The Ruby, is owned by Lacey Burrows (Gabrielle Miller), who inherited it from her Aunt Ruby.

The series completed its run following broadcast of its sixth season on April 13, 2009, with a total of 107 episodes. The show averaged one million viewers per episode. Corner Gas received six Gemini Awards, and was nominated almost 70 times for various awards.

On April 6, 2009, Saskatchewan premier Brad Wall signed a proclamation that declared April 13, 2009, "Corner Gas Day" in Saskatchewan.

Production of an animated adaptation, Corner Gas Animated, was announced in December 2016, and premiered on The Comedy Network on April 2, 2018, featuring the complete original cast voicing their original characters, save for Janet Wright, who died in November 2016, the month prior to announcement. The role of Emma is voiced in the animated version by actress Corrine Koslo.

Production

Concept
The series was created by Canadian comedian Brent Butt, who imagined what his life might be like had he remained in a small Saskatchewan town rather than pursuing stand-up comedy. He originally developed the storyline for CTV and The Comedy Network.

The show focuses on the lifestyle of small-town folk; though set in a small town in Saskatchewan, it is not chiefly about Saskatchewan or Canada, but rather the day-to-day interactions of the residents of Dog River.

Executive producers, directors, and co-producers
Corner Gas was produced by CTV and Prairie Pants Production. Prairie Pants Production is a company assembled by Brent Butt,  Virginia Thompson and 335 Productions. 335 Productions is a partnership between Brent Butt and David Storey.  (The name of the production company is derived from the fact that Tisdale, Saskatchewan, Butt's home town, lies at the junction of Saskatchewan Highways 3 and 35.)  At The Comedy Network, Michelle Daly is Director of Content and Ed Robinson is the President and General Manager.  At CTV Inc., Susanne Boyce is President, Creative, Content and Channels and again Ed Robinson is Executive Vice-President, Programming.  Brent Butt was a driving force as creator, writer, showrunner executive producer, actor and, occasionally, director of the show.
Paul Mather, Mark Farrell, Brent Butt, Andrew Carr, Kevin White, Robert Sheridan, Norm Hiscock, Dylan "Worts" Wertz and Gary Pearson all contributed to writing the series. David Storey, Mark Farrell, Robert de Lint, Jeff Beesley and Brent Butt provided direction in the program.

Corner Gas was promoted by CTV as the network's "first original narrative comedy series." While it is not, in fact, the first Canadian-produced sitcom ever aired on CTV, having been preceded by The Trouble with Tracy, George, Snow Job, Excuse My French, and Check It Out!, it is the first CTV sitcom in which the network itself has held a primary production role, rather than acting solely as a holder of broadcast rights, and the first to postdate the network's late-1990s corporate restructuring from a cooperative of its affiliated stations into a conventional corporation. Corner Gas can also be verifiably called the most successful of these shows.

Filming locations
Corner Gas was filmed entirely in Saskatchewan. The interior shots (Ruby Café interior, Police Department, Oscar and Emma's house, etc.) were filmed at Canada Saskatchewan Production Studios in Regina. All the outdoor scenes and all scenes that take place in the gas station were filmed on location in Rouleau, a small town on Highway 39 between Moose Jaw and Weyburn. The grain elevator was repainted to read "Dog River" instead of "Rouleau"; however, the water tower still reads "Rouleau"with post production effects used to repaint it to read "Dog River" in the first season episode "Grad 68". Regina is known as the "city" in Corner Gas.

On 28September 2014, the building that was used as the FOO[D] MAR[KE]T, the local grocery store, was destroyed in a fire.

On 4November 2016, the site that was used for both Corner Gas and the Ruby was demolished due to the foundations sinking.

In summer 2021, the police station building collapsed, and the debris was removed.  On 5November 2021, the grain elevator burned to the ground.

Episode format
Each episode of Corner Gas is written following a specific formula: two or three (almost always three, once four) storylines are presented in each show. The main storyline usually opens and closes the episode and is most of the time driven by a single character. The secondary plots are sometimes slightly intertwined with the other stories.

Opening sequence
The Corner Gas opening sequence follows a cold open. The opening theme music, "Not a Lot Goin' On", was written by Craig Northey of the rock band Odds and Jesse Valenzuela of the rock band Gin Blossoms, while the closing theme, "My Happy Place" was written by Northey and performed by Odds.

Overview

Brent Leroy (Brent Butt) is the proprietor of the station and Wanda Dollard (Nancy Robertson) works at the station's convenience store as a retail assistant. An adjoining diner, The Ruby, is owned by Lacey Burrows (Gabrielle Miller), who inherited it from her Aunt Ruby and moved to Dog River from Toronto. Brent's parents, Oscar Leroy (Eric Peterson) and Emma Leroy (Janet Wright), are lifetime residents of Dog River. Dog River's police force, consisting entirely of veteran Davis Quinton (Lorne Cardinal) and rookie Karen Pelly (Tara Spencer-Nairn), keep the peace in the small town—a very simple task—and the officers have an overabundance of free time. Finally, Brent's best friend Richard Henry "Hank" Yarbo (Fred Ewanuick), who is constantly unemployed, spends his time hanging out with Dog River's residents and drinking coffee, for which he rarely pays, at The Ruby.

The first episode of Corner Gas aired on January 22, 2004, and attracted 1.5 million viewers. The first season consisted of 13 episodes. Less than two months after the first episode aired, CTV renewed it for a second season of 18 episodes.

Butt's main co-writers were This Hour has 22 Minutes writers Mark Farrell, Paul Mather, Kevin White, and Andrew Carr.

As broadcast of the fourth season finale approached, there was a flurry of news reports suggesting that the series was coming to an unexpected end, based upon televised promotions for the episode, leaked plot details, and wording of a CTV press release issued on March 6, 2007, that implied that the series finale would air on March 12, 2007. Two segments of production footage with time code circulated on YouTube also seemed to indicate a series finale as imminent despite the show's continued success in Canada and recent U.S. sale. On March 7, 2007, CTV clarified its press release, stating it was a season finale, and on March 13, 2007, CTV confirmed an order for a 19-episode fifth season, that premiered on September 24, 2007.

On April 10, 2008, as production of the sixth season began, Butt announced via a press release that he and his production company, Prairie Pants, had decided to conclude production of the series after the sixth season, with the final episodes airing in the spring of 2009. Butt said the decision to end the series while still a popular offering on CTV was "a very difficult decision ... and one I felt I had to make. (CTV) made it clear that they were keen to do more seasons ... I wanted to exit gracefully, on top of our game."

The show's final episode aired on April 13, 2009, airing in simulcast on CTV, The Comedy Network and A. The episode attracted 2,914,000 viewers on terrestrial television and an additional 235,000 on The Comedy Network, for a total viewership of 3,114,000.

Characters
The surnames of all of the main characters and some recurring characters on the show (except for Mayor 'Fitzy' Fitzgerald) are names of small towns in Saskatchewan.

Main cast

Brent Herbert Leroy (Brent Butt) is the comic book-reading, sarcastic proprietor of Corner Gas. He is almost always good-natured, but has a tendency to fixate on minor details. He is a fan of adventure fiction such as The Saint in New York and The Executioner. His favourite food is chili cheese dogs, to the point where he can identify the individual ingredients by taste. Brent is 'adept' at many sports, such as curling, hockey, and softball. His favourite football teams are the Saskatchewan Roughriders and Minnesota Vikings. He and Hank have been best friends since childhood, and Brent often makes fun of him and name multiple instances of Hank's stupidity. As of the Season 5 finale, Brent is 40 years old, and was born on November 6 (thus, his date of birth can be assumed to be November 6, 1967, since Brent graduated high school in 1986). Brent is said to be the hottest guy in Dog River, although other characters on the show acknowledge this is faint praise. He is also the Dog River Table Hockey Champion using a "dump it into the corners" style of play. It is implied that he and Lacey Burrows have feelings for each other, although neither will admit or act upon them. After the end of the series he went on to fulfill his dream of fly-fishing in the Yukon, while looking to wrestle a bear (he didn't find any bears, but he did see either a Sasquatch or an oddly shaped stump). It was revealed in Corner Gas: The Movie that he and Lacey entered into a romantic relationship three years after the end of the series.
Lacey Burrows (Gabrielle Miller) took over the previously unnamed coffee shop in Dog River after her aunt's death and renamed it The Ruby in her honour. Originally from Toronto, Ontario, she is perpetually trying to fit into small-town life, with mixed, often disastrous, results. She is a terrible liar, quick to jump to conclusions, a poor winner, and thinks everybody has a crush on her, and frequently exhibits insecurity and regret about the path her life has taken. She has also expressed frustration at being unable to find "a stable guy" to date in Dog River. She considers herself a sweetheart and secretly believes that she alone of the town's women deserves the "Woman of Distinction" award (which she eventually wins). She is also very knowledgeable when it comes to hockey, coaching Dog River's hockey team, the Dog River Riverdogs. It is implied that she and Brent Leroy have feelings for each other, although neither will admit or act upon them. In season five Karen describes Lacey as "too upbeat, overly fastidious, a little needysame old Lacey!". Her fashion sense trends toward the revealing. This was mocked in the episode "Doc Small", in which she welcomes to Dog River Dr. Chris Garner, a doctor from an even smaller town, and she's shocked by Lacey's "slutty" top, which is actually one of her more conservative tops. After the series' end she opened a second Ruby in Wullerton, but the local health inspectors quickly shut it down. It was revealed in Corner Gas: The Movie that she and Brent entered into a romantic relationship three years after the end of the series.
Richard Henry "Hank" Yarbo (Fred Ewanuick) is Brent's perpetually unemployed best friend. He often hangs out at Corner Gas talking to Brent and constantly borrows money from other characters and rarely pays them back. He has worked at a range of jobs, from census worker to crossing guard to city accountant, never being able to hold down or stay focused in one for long. He expressed a goal of working as a rodeo clown. His mother lives in Saskatoon, and his favourite foods are grape Pop Rocks and pickles (despite accidentally choking on the same pickle two times). Hank is quite childish, doing such things as going to see an adventure movie designed for six-year-olds four times in one week. He is shown to have a lot of interest in the CFL, most notably the Saskatchewan Roughriders, Saskatchewan's football team. In a Christmas-themed episode, it is revealed that as a hockey fan, he likes the Vancouver Canucks. Despite his village-idiot routine, Hank actually has experience in many physical and maintenance activities, including auto mechanics, gardening, knitting, woodworking, and plumbing, making him something of a jack-of-all-trades. After the series, he continued to remain "awesomely" unemployed.
Wanda Dollard (Nancy Robertson) is a quirky cashier at Corner Gas, and the self-professed smartest person in town. She was born on April 16, 1968 (as shown on her driver's license in the episode "The Accidental Cleanist"). Wanda has a sardonic, caustic personality and enjoys lording her knowledge over others. She is the single mother of a six-year-old son, Tanner Vincent Dollard, who is seen on-screen only briefly in the episode "Oh Baby." (It's implied that Hank is Tanner's father; when Wanda is approached about this, she tries to laugh it off, but doesn't deny it outright.) Tanner is portrayed as a living nightmare for prospective babysitters (Season 1, Episode 4) and is a handful for his own mother, doing things like putting peanut butter up her nose while she sleeps. Accused of being a know-it-all, Wanda is also one of very few Dog River residents who has gone to university; she holds a degree in linguistics with a minor in comparative religion but took classes in many other subjects. Despite her extensive education, she considers her job at Corner Gas a privilege. She is shown as having a case of mild agoraphobia in one episode. Like Brent and Hank, Wanda grew up in Dog River. After the end of the series, she pursued a PhD in theoretical physics though she still works at Corner Gas, albeit with a pay raise.
Oscar Leroy (Eric Peterson) is Brent's grouchy, stubborn, occasionally senile elderly-stereotype father, the retired former owner and founder of Corner Gas. His all-purpose word is "jackass"; during the course of the live-action series, he says it ninety times. (It is also the series's final spoken word.) He often demands that the Dog River police arrest everyone who annoys him. He frequently, belligerently, points out to government workers: "My taxes pay your salary!" He tends to exclaim "Holy hell!" on encountering new or surprising things. He rivals Hank in his brain capacity and ability to make mistakes and the two are often shown scheming together. Oscar likes to show his handiwork around the house, but usually makes things worse when he tries to fix things. When Brent suggested selling Corner Gas to a huge company, Oscar replied "How dare you - how dare you keep the Pump and Go people waiting, sell it, sell it now!", showing he didn't love his old job.  This, however, was only part of Hank's fantasy sequence, and may not accurately reflect Oscar’s actual sentiment.  
Emma Leroy (Janet Wright) is Brent's mother, the brains and muscle of the family. She and Oscar squabble constantly and she usually ends up having to deal with the fallout from his actions, which she usually makes worse. Though he embarrasses and annoys her, she does truly love him. She has also found "letting go" of Brent difficult and reacts badly when someone else appears to replace her in some aspect of his life. Her main hobbies are knitting, crocheting, and gardening and she is active in many of the town's committees. She has also been shown to possess great strength (being able to hurl a cinder block at a skunk across the yard with little effort), and other characters often seek her advice. She has a quick-tempered, cunning, domineering personality. After the end of the series she remained married to Oscar, despite doctor's orders.
Sergeant Davis Quinton (Lorne Cardinal) is Dog River's overly-sensitive First Nations senior police officer. He has a habit of misspending the police budget, napping on the job, and making up the laws as he goes along, having never actually read the police manual. Due to the lack of crime in Dog River, he tends to treat his police position more as a 'fun hobby' than a serious job. He is obsessed with Cosmopolitan magazine, retro-TV and classic cartoon shows; and is a science fiction aficionado. He believes that the original Battlestar Galactica may have really happened. His catchphrase is an enthusiastic "All right!". He is a fan of the Saskatchewan Prairie Fire (he is often seen wearing their gear while off-duty). Davis once competed in rhythmic gymnastics; he also has a collection of the original Hardy Boys books. He is unable to make coffee, but is unwilling to tell anyone. When he was a baby his mother left him to join a band; for a long time he thought their cleaning lady was his mom. In the episode named "I Love Lacey", Davis reveals himself to be a member of the Cree Nation. At the end of season 5, Davis is said to be 46 years old, which would make 1961 his year of birth. He was also seen as a police officer in Dog River in 1986 (the "Grad '68" episode in season 1). He lost his sense of smell after being hit on the head as a child, and regains it after falling from a ladder trying to rescue a cat from the Leroys' tree. Davis is divorced but after the end of the series he eventually remarried.
Constable Karen Pelly (Tara Spencer-Nairn) is Dog River's ambitious, sometimes neurotic junior police officer. Before becoming a police officer, she ranked fifth in Canada in the sport of static apnea, with a personal best of more than six minutes. She's a very good cook, but does not like to bring it up for fear it will stereotype her. She does not want to admit that she does not know how to ride a bike. She is also at least 10 years younger than most of the other characters, turning 30 in the sixth season. Karen possesses a variety of skills including cooking, martial arts, drums, drawing, and table hockey; but when she wins a raffle in the sixth season, she says it's the first time she ever won anything. She tends to take her police position very seriously, unlike her partner Davis, and treats even the most minor problem officially. On one occasion, when she mentions to Davis that she feels she has a good lead on a cold case, he stares at her dumbfounded and asks "Why?" Karen frequently becomes annoyed with Davis' willingness to obey the mayor in everything and bend rules. They differ greatly on their views of what a police officer should portray; on one occasion, Karen states that "a police officer should be respected by the community", to which Davis casually replies "Who said that?" Many episodes see them engaged in petty disputes and going to great lengths to one-up each other. Despite their differences, Karen and Davis get along well although they don't spend much time together outside of work. In the episode "Hook, Line and Sinker" Karen goes fishing with Hank and is seduced by his "sexy fish talk". After the end of the series, she falls in love and marries; in Corner Gas: The Movie, Karen's husband is said to be a soldier stationed off the Mediterranean coast, and they are expecting their first child.

Recurring characters

Fitzy Fitzgerald (Cavan Cunningham) is the mayor of Dog River. He tends to take his position very seriously. He is quite paranoid about losing his job and thinks that anyone will do anything for the position of mayor, although no one really wants it. Not a lot is revealed about his personal life; however, several episodes imply that he may have a son.
Wes Humboldt (Mike O'Brien) owns and operates the liquor and insurance store in town. His father died saving his entire platoon in the Korean War, although everyone told him that he ran off to join the circus. Wes later learns the truth when Brent reads out a passage from a book detailing the history of Dog River, not knowing that Wes was not supposed to hear it.
Paul Kinistino (Mark Dieter) is the bartender at the Dog River Hotel. He is a Cree man, and speaks a little bit of the Cree language.  He went to high school with Brent, Wanda and Hank.  In the episode "Cell Phone", he replaces the shuffleboard game in the bar with a claw game, to which Oscar becomes addicted.  In "Friend of a Friend", he claims to have a Master's degree in history. In season four, Paul is replaced by a new bartender—Phil Kinistino (Erroll Kinistino) -- but, it's never revealed how they are related.
Josh the Cook (Josh Strait) is the reserved chef at The Ruby. In "Safety First", he temporarily quits his job and first speaks, telling Lacey he wants to become a llama farmer. When Lacey asked Brent if he was aware Josh wanted to work with llamas, Brent replied, "I didn't even know he could talk." Josh Strait also hosted the tours of the Corner Gas set in Regina, Saskatchewan.
Helen Jensen (Jean Freeman), the mayor's grandmother, is also known as "Fitzy's Grandma".  In the episode "World's Biggest Thing", she is the one who innocently suggests Dog River build the "World's Biggest Hoe" to honour Dog River's farming heritage.  Brent disagrees but can't bear to tell her about the inappropriate connotations of that phrase.
Myrtle Runciman (Gwen Seed) is a batty elderly neighbour of Oscar and Emma's who appears many times over the course of the show.  She is a member of their curling team and in one episode is seen driving a large pickup truck.  Often she is vague and senile, but she has been known to make pointed remarks about the other characters.

Notable guest stars
A number of notable Canadian celebrities and politicians appeared as guest stars or in cameo roles on Corner Gas. Some celebrities made the trip to the Rouleau or Regina sets to film their appearances, others were filmed in the applicable locations (e.g., scenes involving cast members of Canadian Idol and Canada AM were filmed at the respective programs' studios).

Two successive sitting prime ministers, Paul Martin and Stephen Harper, made cameo appearances; Corner Gas is the only fictional sitcom (as opposed to sketch comedy series) in which sitting prime ministers have appeared. Two successive sitting premiers of Saskatchewan, Lorne Calvert and Brad Wall, also appeared in episodes. "Demolition" features Former Governor-General Adrienne Clarkson, taking a sledgehammer to an old barn. Ben Mulroney, host of TV shows Canadian Idol and eTalk Daily and the son of former Prime Minister Brian Mulroney, parodies himself during the third season episode "Dog River Vice".

In the first season Kevin McDonald of The Kids in the Hall played Marvin Drey, a disliked Revenue Canada agent in the episode "Tax Man"'. In the same episode Dan Matheson, a news anchor for CTV, appeared as himself. Julie Stewart played a paint store clerk (parodying her role in Cold Squad) in "Grad 68". Comedian Mike Wilmot played Carl Vaughn, Brent's snobby cousin. Colin Mochrie, a prolific Canadian comedy actor best known for his work in the British and American versions of Whose Line Is It Anyway?, made a cameo appearance in the episode "Comedy Night" as part of a joke about how he seems to turn up on every Canadian TV show. Pamela Wallin, former CBC newscaster, later Canadian Consul General and senator, a native of Wadena, Saskatchewan, played herself. Canadian Idol judges Sass Jordan, Zack Werner, Jake Gold, and Farley Flex appeared as themselves rating Brent's rendition of "It would never rain in Dog River ... If I Could Squeegee the Sky" in the episode "Hook, Line and Sinker". TSN sportscaster (and U8TV: The Lofters alumnus) Jennifer Hedger and her SportsCentre colleague Darren Dutchyshen appeared as themselves in the episode "Face Off".

The second season also attracted notable personalities.  "Wedding Card" featured hockey star Darryl Sittler as himself. Pat Fiacco, then-mayor of Regina, appears in the episode "Whataphobia" as Stan, the owner of Dog River's miniature golf course. "Poor Brent" has an appearance by long-time CTV National News anchor Lloyd Robertson, playing himself. Canadian and world champion curlers Randy Ferbey and Dave Nedohin (both of whom curl for Alberta) appear as themselves providing advice during the hotly contested Dog River curling championship, the Clavet Cup in episode "Hurry Hard". The episode "An American In Saskatchewan" features Mark McKinney, a veteran of both The Kids in the Hall and Saturday Night Live as Bill, an American who visits Dog River by accident.  Saskatchewan-born musician Colin James appears as a local musician (although it is implied that he's actually playing himself) who performs an audition in Brent's garage. The rock group The Tragically Hip appear as "local kids" who practise in Brent's garage. The Tragically Hip play a rough version of "It Can't Be Nashville Every Night" off their In Between Evolution album.  Both The Tragically Hip and Colin James are in the episode "Rock On!"

Singer Jann Arden appears as herself in "Fun Run". Noted actress Shirley Douglas (mother of Kiefer Sutherland, and daughter of Tommy Douglas, former Premier of Saskatchewan) plays a woman with the hots for Oscar in "Trees a Crowd". Then-federal finance minister Ralph Goodale appears as a Ruby Café customer in "Picture Perfect". (The episode aired the same day Goodale filed a "mini-budget" in the House of Commons.) Lorne Calvert, premier of Saskatchewan, appears as himself. He appears three times: twice to poke fun at Sweden and once to almost get hit by a thrown newspaper during the appropriately named "Ruby Newsday". Vicki Gabereau appears as herself during a fantasy sequence in the same episode. Prior to the debut of Corner Gas, the cast had appeared on Gabereau's CTV talk show, during which Brent Butt promised to get the talk show host a guest appearance.  "Merry Gasmas" features This Hour has 22 Minutes anchor Gavin Crawford as a worker in the Calgary International Airport. He would always call cities their airport names (YYC, YEG) which confused Lacey horribly. In the same episode Dan Redican from The Frantics, and more recently Puppets Who Kill, makes an appearance as a worker in the Regina International Airport. He repeatedly says "made that call."  Comedy Inc. star Roman Danylo makes a cameo as a passenger sitting next to Lacey on a plane from Alberta to Vancouver. He claims to be a "cat doctor," and not a veterinarian. He manages to out-chat Lacey while talking about cats during the same episode. Ken Read, also known as "The Crazy Canuck," is a champion alpine skier and member of the Canadian Olympic Committee.  During episode "Physical Credit", Read receives a browbeating from Oscar (which first aired the day after closing ceremonies of the 2006 Winter Olympics).

Olympic medal winner Cindy Klassen makes a cameo appearance in the fourth season episode "Dog River Dave". Mike Holmes, the star of Holmes on Homes, helps to fix Oscar's bathroom. Wanda states that she had formerly dated the Holmes character in the episode "Jail House". CTV CEO Ivan Fecan makes a cameo appearance during the episode "Blog River". "Gopher It" featured then Prime Minister Stephen Harper as himself.  Canada AM co-anchors Seamus O'Regan and Beverly Thomson appear, playing themselves. Unlike most cameos, O'Regan and Thomson appear extensively in this episode to parody their on-screen image.  CTV National News reporter Rosemary Thompson appears, playing herself in a scrum with the Prime Minister at the gas station.

During the fifth season three episodes bring in notable personalities. In "Coming Distractions", Duane "Dog" Chapman and Beth Smith from Dog the Bounty Hunter appear to arrest Brent during a fantasy sequence. In the episode "Bed and Brake Fast" hockey player Travis Moen makes a cameo appearance with the Stanley Cup. In the episode "Final Countdown" actor Kiefer Sutherland makes a cameo appearance. In the same episode, Shirley Douglas' voice is heard.

Michael Bublé appears in the sixth season episode "TV Free Dog River". He calls in (unseen at first) to Davis's jazz radio program, requesting a song from Michael Bublé. After Davis says that "Michael Bublé isn't jazz", the camera cuts to the actual singer, who says sadly that he "cuts across several genres of music".

Setting

Dog River
Dog River (Rouleau, Saskatchewan) has a population of "about 500" according to "Census Sensibility". The rival town of Wullerton is "just down the road". In fact, the term "the city" has been used at various times in the series to refer to Regina. The third season episode, "Fun Run" has one character drive to Weyburn for a lark, suggesting Dog River is probably closer to Regina than it is to Saskatoon. In the episode "Outside Joke", when the Corner Gas station is believed to actually be outside the town limits, it is said to be in the fictional municipality of Pitt Creek. In "Kid Stuff", Wanda says it is south of the also fictional Crowley Lake.

The town's name is an homage to series creator Brent Butt's hometown of Tisdale, Saskatchewan, through which the Doghide River flows. However, in the show itself, the second season episode "Rock On!" revealed that the town was named after a great uncle of Lacey's who drowned a dozen dogs in the river. She discovered this trivia while researching information for a history plaque. In order to play down this unsavoury branch of her family tree, Lacey instead used a story that Karen made up—that pioneers somehow got hold of a hot air balloon, got an aerial view of the town site, and noticed that the creek formed a shape similar to that of a dog's leg. "Block Party" revealed that the town was founded in 1905, and its founder was a Mr. Harold Main after whom Main Street was named (it was later renamed Centennial Street in 2005, the origin of the name being forgotten.) Main also constructed Dog River's first building, a wooden shack that would later be burned down by Hank Yarbo a century later in order to maintain the accuracy of his Lego scale model of the town (he ran out of blocks and could not make a replica of the shack.)

A real-life Regina tour operator regularly takes busloads of tourists to Rouleau to visit "Dog River". Visitors can tour the on-location sets of Corner Gas, including the service station. Many components of Dog River are, in fact, real attributes of Rouleau, notably the combined liquor and insurance store.

On February 9, 2010, Google Street View extended its coverage of Canada, including all streets within Rouleau. The remnants of the Corner Gas and Ruby standing sets, along with the grain elevator labelled "Dog River" are visible from ground level at the junction of Highways 39 and 714. The grain elevator, built in 1972, was destroyed by fire on Nov. 5, 2021.

After falling into disrepair when the show ended, the Rouleau sets were purchased by businessman Sylvain Senecal and restored as a souvenir shop. The sets were open from May 1 until late September where Corner Gas, Saskatchewan and regular convenience store items could be purchased, and were later once again utilized for Corner Gas: The Movie. However, by 2016, the Ruby and Corner Gas sets had once again fallen into disrepair and, due to being built on a bog, had begun to sink and were declared unsafe. On November 4, 2016, the buildings were demolished. Despite this, however, the town of Rouleau announced at the same time plans for a walking tour of surviving Corner Gas sets to launch in 2017, while the Western Development Museum branch in Moose Jaw announced plans to exhibit artifacts from the series, including the original Corner Gas sign.

The Howler
The town has its own newspaper, The Dog River Howler (usually just called "The Howler"), to which almost everybody has contributed at one point or another. Its headlines are usually rife with inaccurate, sensationalist reporting. An example of exaggeration can be seen in "Hero Sandwich," in which a proposal to install traffic lights at a four-way intersection prompts the headline "Crosswalk HELL—Mayor Insane." Another example occurs (mentioned in the same episode) when coyotes wander into town to eat cats, prompting the incorrectly spelled headline "Cattle Killed by Werewolfs." An example of simply untrue reporting can be seen in the first episode, in which a headline reads "Moose Jaw Gets NBA Franchise.", and at an unseen time, they declared that Canada was apparently at war with Switzerland. The paper is also rife with misspellings, for example in the third season that "Hank is PHYCIC (phycic [sic])." (the story was "contunied" on page 30) or in the fourth season that "Cop nabs barely thief" (after Karen mentions that the person who was caught was 'barely a thief' for having stolen a grain truck).

Emergency services

They also park behind the "surveillance bush" waiting for speeders.

In "The Littlest Yarbo," a short-lived Fire Department consisting of two firefighters, David and Carol (both showing remarkable similarities to Davis and Karen, respectively), was established by the mayor when the volunteer fire chief decided to sleep in as opposed to respond to a fire. The volunteer system was reestablished after Hank, Davis, and Oscar lit an uncontrollable leaf fire and the fire department did not respond as they were chasing a stray dog (the same one Hank thought to be "The Littlest Hobo"). Fitzy saw Davis in the aftermath as the only first responder there and gave him the new title of Chief, Volunteer Fire Department.

The Dog River Police have two police cars, both 1994 Ford Crown Victorias.  With the exception of the first episode and "Dark Circles," the police use only one of them.

Wullerton rivalry
The residents of Dog River have a pathological dislike of the residents of Wullerton, a neighbouring town, to the point that they spit on the ground whenever the rival town is mentioned.  They are so used to doing so that they sometimes do not realize it when they spit. Dog River's local newspaper, the Howler, will even print "(SPIT)" after printing the word "Wullerton". However, the people of Wullerton may not hate Dog River, as seen in the fourth season's finale. (However, this was only part of Hank's fantasy sequence, and may not accurately reflect Wullerton's actual sentiment towards Dog River). The reason for this antipathy was never explained. Publicity for the second season indicated that the season finale would reveal the reason for the spitting; however, the episode as broadcast did not actually do so. This practice of looking down on neighbouring towns is common in many prairie communities, primarily those in Saskatchewan and Alberta, such as Tisdale, Melfort, and Wilcox. Wullerton is first shown onscreen in Corner Gas: The Movie, as for the reason Dog River residents hate it so much: Wullerton is a creepy, eerily Stepford Wives-ish town where everyone is excessively nice and clean-cut, which tends to scare any visitors from Dog River.

Thunderface
Thunderface is an in-universe fictional band that was formed in the mid-'80s by lead singer Hank Yarbo, lead guitar player Brent Leroy, and bass guitar player Wanda Dollard. In 2005, the band was expanded to include drummer Karen Pelly, the most competent musician in the group. (While filming, Fred Ewanuick did his own singing as Hank, Brent Butt played all of his own guitar parts, and Nancy Robertson learned to play bass shortly before filming commenced. Only Tara Spencer-Nairn did not do her own playing for the episode.)

Thunderface has suffered from relative anonymity due to confusion with their name (as well as the fact that they have had only one gig since 1986). They have been referred to as "Rumblepuss," "Thunderbread," "Thunderchunks," and "Wonderface," among other names. Their sound is described as similar to "a small animal caught in some kind of machinery," and their sole gig since 1986 was booked due to the humorous nature of their poor performance. Along with their gig in 1986, they seemed to have done some school performances considering they blew the principal's eyebrows off. The only song they have been heard to play is "Capital Cash" by Fast Exit, a band that Brent Butt played guitar in before he got into comedy.

The Surveillance Bush
The Surveillance Bush is a bush that is only seen in the first episode and the last episode. Karen is seen hiding behind it in the Police Cruiser in Ruby Reborn. Davis and Karen are also seen on the last episode hiding behind it before tailing Brent in the final episode. Since there is no wind a cast member is actually lying down shaking the bush. The bush was only planted for those two scenes.

Broadcast and distribution

First run broadcast
In 2006, Corner Gas was the only Canadian-made top-20 TV show in all of Canada (other than hockey), the rest being American imports. It debuted in January 2004, outperforming all U.S. sitcoms among adults 25–54.

Since 2004, the series's production coincided with that of another CTV program, Robson Arms in which Gabrielle Miller and Fred Ewanuick also co-starred. Miller also had a recurring role in the series Alienated in 2004, giving her the rare distinction of playing major roles in three unrelated television series during the same calendar year (although Robson Arms was not broadcast until 2005). As of fall 2007, two seasons of Robson Arms featuring Miller and Ewanuick have been produced and released to DVD.

Early in the run of Corner Gas, Toronto Sun television critic Bill Brioux reported an unconfirmed rumour that it had been unsuccessfully pitched to CBC Television, which came to be cited as evidence that the public broadcaster was out of touch with Canadian audiences. This was later revealed to be untrue; The Comedy Network was in fact the first and only network to which the show was proposed.

Fred Ewanuick appeared as Hank on the Royal Canadian Air Farce'''s 300th episode in a spoof of Corner Gas, in which Yasir (Carlo Rota) and Sarah (Sheila McCarthy) from CBC's Little Mosque on the Prairie bought the gas station and fired Brent. Hank then debated with them the location of Mercy (the Saskatchewan town where Little Mosque takes place) in relation to Dog River.

Live episode
In the summer of 2006, the cast of Corner Gas performed a fund-raising benefit event for Regina's Globe Theatre called Corner Gas...Live, in which the cast performed a live episode of the TV series. The popularity of the hit sitcom caused such a rush for tickets that the Globe Theatre's online ticket sales system briefly went down as a result. Another benefit was held during the summer of 2007.

United States broadcast
On November 24, 2006, it was announced that Corner Gas would air on the American WGN America beginning September 17, 2007. Corner Gas was syndicated to WGN America by Multi-Platform Distribution Company (MPDC), which acquired the American distribution rights for broadcast stations and cable channels. The show was offered to cable networks such as WGN America on an all-cash basis; the show was also offered to local stations on cash-plus-barter basis, though it was unknown if any channels other than WGN America carried the series. The series was carried by WGN America during the 2008–2009 television season; it was not broadcast in Chicago on WGN-TV.

In an unusual case, WGN America picked up Season 5 episodes while they were airing contemporaneously on the show's home network CTV. In most cases, new episodes usually take a year or more to air in another country.

On October 3, 2019, Amazon-owned IMDb announced that it will be exclusively streaming the entire Corner Gas franchise on their platform for free to American viewers starting October 15, 2019.

DVD releases
The first season was released on DVD in Canada on October 19, 2004. In keeping with the theme of the series, each DVD set included a coupon good for a free coffee at Petro-Canada service stations. At the Canadian Entertainment Network Awards, Season one DVD was honoured as "Best Canadian DVD-English".  The second season was released on DVD on September 27, 2005, and features the distinction of being one of the few regular TV series whose DVD box set includes described video for the visually impaired. The second season set was released by CTV and Video Service Corporation and includes a peek at Season 3, bloopers, cast and crew interviews, a Thunderface music video as well as all season 2 episodes. The season three DVD was released on October 3, 2006. Unlike the previous sets, the third season DVD set is presented in widescreen (letterboxed on 4:3 televisions, Windowboxed on widescreen TVs). The fourth season was released on DVD on September 18, 2007. From the fourth season forward, the episodes are presented in proper anamorphic widescreen. This was the first time the DVD set of the previous season was released before the current season started airing; the set includes a series of "Mobisodes" which were short (approximately two minutes each) skits focusing on the main characters. Season 5 was released on DVD on October 7, 2008, and is presented in a bobble-head theme. Besides all nineteen season 5 episodes, the set includes Corner Gas character commentaries, "My Happy Place" in a music video format and bloopers. Season 5 DVD set has enclosed a $10 discount coupon towards a Corner Gas mechanic shirt. Season 6 was released on June 9, 2009, two months after the series finale.

In Australia only the first three series have been released. The cover art for the seasons differ from the Region 1 releases. The first two seasons having the group of the cast in front of the gas station which is in the distant background, while the third season has them in front of the grain silo. Unlike the Canadian release, the Australian version of Season 3 contains anamorphic widescreen versions of the episodes. Curiously, though, almost all of these episodes do not have any on-screen actor credits or captions (such as the show's writers/directors) over any of the live action, suggesting that perhaps the DVD company had to go back to the original film elements in order to  get an anamorphic picture.
Corner Gas – Series 1 (2 Disc Set) – April 13, 2007
Corner Gas – Series 2 (3 Disc Set) – July 14, 2009
Corner Gas – Series 3 (3 Disc Set) – July 14, 2010

Complementary media

Comedy tour
Brent Butt offered the eight-city "Gassed Up" tour beginning March 21, 2004. The $70,000 "Great Canadian Gas Giveaway Tour" began September 27, 2004. In late September 2004, to promote the start of the second season, the cast members of Corner Gas travelled to cities across Canada where they pumped gas at local service stations for the day (the fuel being provided to motorists free of charge). By the halfway point of the promotion, more than 40,000 litres of free gasoline had been pumped.  The cast of Corner Gas crossed Canada visiting six cities in a comedy tour called CTV Presents Corner Gas Live! which began September 21, 2005.  Eight Canadian radio stations broadcast the show live at the start of the fourth season.

 Comic Genius 
In 2005, Corner Gas partnered with The Comedy Network to host a contest called Comic Genius. The majority of episodes were broadcast online, with the one-hour finale broadcast live on The Comedy Network in February 2006. The winner, John Beuhler, won $10,000 and a guest appearance on the show.

Corner Gas Online
"Corner Gas Online" provides cast biographies, episode synopsis, bloopers, and a visit to Virtual Dog River. The Virtual Dog River features The Howler providing the latest news about the television series. There are online games available such as prairie scramble, combine racing and the perfect pump when visiting various locations in virtual Dog River. Oscar and Emma Leroy's virtual home features Corner Gas bloopers. Visiting the Ruby will provide an online chat room.  The virtual gas station is an online shop for licensed merchandise.Corner Gas episodes can now be watched on demand on The CTV Video Player at CTV.ca and thecomedynetwork.ca.

Licensed merchandiseCorner Gas has spawned a merchandising business, with hundreds of retail items, sold-out live touring productions, and best-selling DVDs. A companion book to the show, called Tales from Dog River: The Complete Corner Gas Guide, was published on November 4, 2006. It was written by Toronto journalist Michele Sponagle and was produced in conjunction with CTV, Penguin Canada, and Prairie Pants Productions. The book debuted in the number two spot among new releases, behind only Vincent Lam's Giller Prize-winning book Bloodletting and Miraculous Cures. On December 12, 2006, it was the top-selling non-fiction paperback in Canada, according to BookMarket data. It includes cast interviews, an episode guide, insider jokes, bloopers, best lines, a look at the real Dog River (Rouleau, Saskatchewan), and a chronology on how the show was created from inception to debut episode. Author Michele Sponagle went on a book tour to cities across Canada, including Ottawa, Halifax, Toronto, Edmonton and Vancouver to promote the book, alongside various cast members.
A follow-up to the book called Dog River Confidential: The Super, Even More Complete Corner Gas Guide, also by author Michele Sponagle, was released by Penguin Canada on November 10, 2009.

Corner Gas: The MovieCorner Gas: The Movie premiered on December 3, 2014 for a limited five-day release in select Canadian theaters. All of the major cast members returned for the film.  A Kickstarter campaign for Corner Gas: The Movie was successfully funded on June 19, 2014. TSN's Jay Onrait and Dan O'Toole are in the film (formerly of Fox Sports 1), as well as TSN anchor Darren Dutchyshen and Olympic Gold Medalist Jon Montgomery.

The movie made its broadcast premiere on CTV on 17 December 2014 and has been released on both Blu-ray and DVD.

Animated series

A 13-episode animated series, titled Corner Gas Animated was announced on December 19, 2016. The series features the voices of many original cast members (Corrine Koslo provided the voice of Emma Leroy, replacing the late Janet Wright). It debuted in April 2018. In October 2019, it was announced that it was renewed for a third season to air on CTV Comedy Channel in 2020. In October 2019, after a third season renewal, during the second season broadcast, it was announced that Amazon's IMDb TV (now Amazon Freevee), starting October 20. The fourth and final season premiered in July 2021 on CTV. Freevee announced in April 2022, as part of their rebrand from IMDb TV to Freevee, that the final season would release on June 20, 2022.

ImpactCorner Gas presently airs in 26 countries.  Free land was awarded through the Corner Gas website which enabled a Quebec couple to move to Climax. In Rouleau, a local resident started a "Ruby" café. In the third season episode "Mail Fraud", Brent used the term staycation to explain the act of taking a vacation without actually leaving home. This term, originally coined in an article from The Myrtle Beach Sun-News, is now in use on many pages on the internet and has passed into the general lexicon, even to the extent of being included in Merriam-Webster's Collegiate Dictionary.

The show was named ninth on Entertainment's Top 10 Greatest Canadian Television Shows.

AwardsCorner Gas has won a variety of awards since it debuted as a series January 2004 including nine Canadian Comedy Awards and six Gemini Awards. The Canadian Comedy Awards include Best Direction (TV Series)—2004–2006, Best Male Performance (TV)—2004 and 2005 (Brent Butt), 2007 (Eric Peterson), Best Female Performance (TV)—2006 (Janet Wright) and Best Writing (TV Series)—2004 and 2007.

The six Gemini Awards include Best Comedy Program or Series—2005, 2006, and 2007; Best Ensemble Performance in a Comedy Program or Series—for the episode "Gopher It", 2007; Best Writing in a Comedy or Variety Program or Series—Mark Ferrell for the episode "Gopher It", 2007; and Best Interactive—2005. 2007 was the third consecutive year that Corner Gas won the best comedy award.

The show also has eight other Gemini Award nominations. It was nominated for an International Emmy Award in 2004.

In 2004, the show was honoured with the DGC Award win for Outstanding Team Achievement in a TV Series—Comedy. They were also nominated in 2005. Corner Gas received the WGC Award win in 2005 for Best Comedy & Variety Program. Corner Gas also lays claim to seven Leo Award wins.Corner Gas received two awards at the 7th Canadian Comedy Awards. The awards were given for best direction and to Janet Wright achieved the award for top female performer. Corner Gas'' writers received an award for the episode "Comedy Night" at the 9th annual Canadian Screenwriting Awards on April 18, 2005. Writers Mark Farrell and Robert Sheridan received the 2008 Canadian Screenwriting Award for best half-hour drama series on April 14, 2008.

References

External links

 Official website
 Official Online Store – Powered by Bruzer.com
 

CTV Television Network original programming
2000s Canadian sitcoms
2004 Canadian television series debuts
2009 Canadian television series endings
2000s Canadian workplace comedy television series
CTV Comedy Channel original programming
Culture of Saskatchewan
Gemini and Canadian Screen Award for Best Comedy Series winners
Police comedy television series
Television series by Bell Media
Television series set in restaurants
Television series set in shops
Television shows adapted into films
Television shows filmed in Regina, Saskatchewan
Television shows set in Saskatchewan